Gorna kula is a village in Kardzhali Province in the very south of Bulgaria, located in the Eastern Rhodopes on the banks of the river Krumovitsa. The majority of its population consists of ethnic Turks.

Villages in Kardzhali Province